(May 5, 1931 – April 7, 2013) was a Japanese ski jumper who competed in the early 1950s. He finished tied for 36th in the individual large hill event at the 1952 Winter Olympics in Oslo, and finished 13th at the 1956 Winter Olympics in Cortina d'Ampezzo.

References

External links

1931 births
2013 deaths
Ski jumpers at the 1952 Winter Olympics
Ski jumpers at the 1956 Winter Olympics
Nordic combined skiers at the 1956 Winter Olympics
Japanese male ski jumpers
Japanese male Nordic combined skiers
Olympic ski jumpers of Japan
Olympic Nordic combined skiers of Japan